Fairfield Harbour is an unincorporated community and census-designated place (CDP) in Craven County, North Carolina, United States. The population was 2,952 at the 2010 census, up from 1,983 in 2000. It is part of the New Bern, North Carolina Metropolitan Statistical Area.

Geography
Fairfield Harbour is located in east-central Craven County at  (35.074045, -76.960898), in reclaimed marshland bordered by the Neuse River to the southwest and Upper Broad Creek to the east.

Demographics

2020 census

As of the 2020 United States census, there were 2,767 people, 1,342 households, and 985 families residing in the CDP.

2000 census
As of the census of 2000, there were 1,983 people, 999 households, and 773 families residing in the CDP. The population density was 685.1 people per square mile (264.9/km2). There were 1,248 housing units at an average density of 431.2/sq mi (166.7/km2). The racial makeup of the CDP was 96.77% White, 2.37% African American, 0.10% Native American, 0.40% Asian, 0.10% from other races, and 0.25% from two or more races. Hispanic or Latino of any race were 0.40% of the population.

There were 999 households, out of which 6.4% had children under the age of 18 living with them, 74.6% were married couples living together, 1.9% had a female householder with no husband present, and 22.6% were non-families. 19.9% of all households were made up of individuals, and 15.6% had someone living alone who was 65 years of age or older. The average household size was 1.98 and the average family size was 2.23.

In the CDP, the population was spread out, with 6.2% under the age of 18, 1.9% from 18 to 24, 8.5% from 25 to 44, 31.1% from 45 to 64, and 52.3% who were 65 years of age or older. The median age was 66 years. For every 100 females, there were 96.5 males. For every 100 females age 18 and over, there were 95.0 males.

The median income for a household in the CDP was $51,435, and the median income for a family was $57,853. Males had a median income of $33,462 versus $19,954 for females. The per capita income for the CDP was $27,368. About 1.3% of families and 3.6% of the population were below the poverty line, including 10.8% of those under age 18 and 1.6% of those age 65 or over.

References

Census-designated places in Craven County, North Carolina
Census-designated places in North Carolina
New Bern micropolitan area
Populated places on the Neuse River